Per aspera ad astra is a Latin phrase meaning "through hardships to the stars" and is the motto of many organizations. It may also refer to:

 Per Aspera Ad Astra (film), a 1981 Soviet science fiction film
 Per Aspera Ad Astra (album), an album by Stars of the Lid
 "Per Aspera Ad Astra", a song by the band Haggard from the album Eppur Si Muove
 "Per Aspera Ad Astra", a Die Apokalyptischen Reiter song from the album Samurai
 Last chapter in the Mafia II video game
 "Per Aspera Ad Astra", the personal motto of Julie Payette, 29th Governor General of Canada and a former astronaut with 25 days in space.
 Per Aspera, a video game

Ad astra per aspera may refer to:
 Ad Astra per Aspera (band), a band from Lawrence, Kansas
 Ad Astra per Aspera (album), an album by Abandon Kansas
 "Ad Astra Per Aspera", a song by Acceptance from the album Phantoms
 Aspera (band), initially known as Aspera ad Astra
 Ad Astra per Aspera (manga) a Japanese manga series by Kenjiro Hata

See also 
Ad astra (phrase), a Latin phrase meaning "to the stars"
Ad astra (phrase)#Ad astra per aspera, additional uses
Per ardua ad astra, "Through adversity to the stars" or "Through struggle to the stars", motto of the Royal Air Force during World War I.
Ad astra (phrase)#Per ardua ad astra, additional uses with reference to above article
Per aspera ad astra, "Through hardships to the stars" or "A rough road leads to the stars"
Ad astra (phrase)#Per aspera ad astra, reference above article